Los Lunnis is a Spanish children's television show produced by TVE and broadcast by La 2 from 15 September 2003 and Clan since 2010 after the change on La 2's programming. It was also broadcast on the weekends in La 1 until 2011. Its characters are puppets moved and interpreted by puppeteer actors.

The authors of the original idea are the TVE screenwriters Carmina Roig and Daniel Cerdà. Both conceived it, first under the supervision of the director of TVE Catalonia, Paco Freixinet, and later under the former head of news programmes, Valentín Villagrasa. Thanks to the song "Los Lunnis y los ninos nos vamos a la cama", composed by Cerdà and Jaume Copons, the program gained popularity. Currently, the show is composed of the following blocks: Lunnis and their friends, The Musical Rocket, Lunnipedia, and UNICEF.

Plot 
The Lunnis are extraterrestrial beings that live in the world of Luna Lunera. There they have to resolve all type of plots and problems, some caused by the pirate Lucanero, who wants to steal the Big Magic Book of the witch Lubina. In March 2009, begins a new stage in which it changes the appearance of the Lunnis, the world of the Lunnis and the disappearance of the majority of the characters.

Beside the characters, the space was presented by the singer Lucrecia, between his première and 2008, accompanied, during the first season by Àlex Casademunt.

Broadcast 
 It is broadcast in Mexico by Canal 5 of Televisa, and in Chile by the Canal Regional de Concepción.
 From September 2007 It Is broadcast in Italy by Rai 2.
 In the Brazil is aired in the Futura.
 In Portugal, the show was aired in RTP.

Awards and other participations 
 The episode "Lulanieves" written by Daniel Cerdà and made by Joan Albert Planell wins the 1st Prize of the «Prix Jeunesse Iberoamericano 2005»., in the section of fiction for readers from birth to 6 years.
 One of the puppets, Lucho, was the Spanish spokesperson at the Junior Eurovision Song Contest 2004.
 In 2006 it is chosen by the organisation of the  Emmys as the best European children's show, thus being nominated for the prize. Besides it was shortlisted for the Japan Prize 2006 that celebrated  to finals of the month of October of that same year in Shibuya.
 In  2007 the Lunnis collaborated with the General Direction of Traffic in a campaign of traffic education that was issued with the aim to teach to the boys norms of behaviour, as much as pedestrians, like users of car. The title of the series of 13 episodes was "The Lunnis: Traffic Security " and received in Hamburg, the World Media Festival silver prize, in the section of preschool education.

Discography 
 Nos vamos a la cama (Sony 2003)
 Vacaciones con Los Lunnis (Sony 2004)
 Navidad con Los Lunnis (Sony 2004)
 ¡Despierta ya! (Sony 2004)
 Cumple Cumpleaños (Sony & BMG 2005)
 Dame tu Mano, La Canción del Verano (Sony & BMG 2007)
 La Fiesta del Verano (Sony & BMG 2008)
 Mis amigos del mundo (Sony & BMG 2008)
 Los Lunnis con María Isabel (Universal 2009)

References

External links 
 Official  site
 Special Christmas year 2005

RTVE shows
Spanish children's television series
Spanish television shows featuring puppetry
2003 Spanish television series debuts